Granville is an English surname, a middle name, and a given name. Notable people with the name include:

People with the surname
 Granville Leveson-Gower, 1st Earl Granville, (1773-1846) known as Viscount Granville from 1815 to 1833, and as Earl Granville from 1833-36;  British diplomat
 Granville Leveson-Gower, 2nd Earl Granville, (1815-1891), British statesman and diplomat
Andrew Granville (born 1962), British mathematician
Arthur Granville (1912–1987), Welsh footballer
Augustus Granville (1783–1872), Italian physician, writer, and patriot
Sir Bevil Granville (died 1706), English soldier and governor of Barbados
Bonita Granville (1923–1988), American film actress and TV producer
Charles Granville, 2nd Earl of Bath (1661–1701), English soldier, politician, diplomat, courtier
Charles Granville (early 20th century), English book publisher
Christine Granville, nom de guerre of Krystyna Skarbek (1908–1952), Polish agent of the British Special Operations Executive during the Second World War
Damiete Charles Granville (born 1988), Nigerian model
Danny Granville (born 1975), English footballer
Denis Granville (1637–1703), English non-juring cleric, Dean of Durham, then Jacobite exile
Edgar Granville, Baron Granville of Eye (1898–1998), British politician
Fred LeRoy Granville (1896–1932), English photographer
George Granville, 1st Baron Lansdowne (1666–1735), English poet, playwright, and politician
Harley Granville-Barker (1877–1946) English actor-manager, director, producer, critic and playwright
Jake Granville (born 1989), Australian Rugby League player
John Granville, 1st Earl of Bath (1628–1701), English Royalist soldier and statesman during the Civil War
John Granville, 1st Baron Granville of Potheridge (1665–1707), English soldier, landowner and politician
John Granville (soccer) (born 1956), Tobagonian retired professional football goalkeeper
John Granville (diplomat) (1974–2008), diplomat with the United States Agency for International Development
Joseph Granville (1923–2013), American financial writer and investment speaker
Laura Granville (born 1981), American tennis player
Michael Granville  (born 1978), American middle-distance runner
Ralph Granville (born 1931), Scottish former footballer
Ranulf de Glanvill (or Glanvil, Glanville, Granville, etc., died 1190), Chief Justiciar of England during the reign of King Henry II (1154–89) 
Richard Granville (1907–1972), English cricketer
Roy Granville (1910–1986), American sound engineer
Sydney Granville (1880–1959), British singer and actor
William Anthony Granville (1863–1943), American mathematician, the sixth president of Gettysburg College from 1910 until 1923

People with the middle name
William Granville Cochran (1844–1932), American judge and politician

People with the given name
Granville Pearl Aikman (1858-1923), American judge
Granville Bantock (1868–1946), British composer of classical music.
Granville Bates (1882–1940), American character actor and bit player
Granville Wilbur "Granny" Hamner (1927-1993), American professional baseball player
Granville Hicks (1901–1982), American literary figure
Granville Perkins (1830–1895), American artist and illustrator
Granville Sharp (1735–1813), British scholar involved in the abolitionist movement
Granville Woods (1856–1910), African-American inventor
Granville Stanley Hall (1846-1924), American psychologist who received the first psychology doctorate in the United States
Granville Ryrie (1865-1937) Australian general, politician, and High Commissioner to the United Kingdom
Granville Rodrigo (1958-1999), Sri Lankan Sinhala actor and vocalist

Fictional characters
Granville (Open All Hours), played by David Jason
Professor Granville, from Big Hero 6: The Series

See also
Granville (disambiguation)
Grenville (disambiguation)

English-language surnames